The 1906–07 Scottish Division One season was won by Celtic by seven points over nearest rival Dundee.

League table

Results

References

Scottish Football Archive

1906–07 Scottish Football League
Scottish Division One seasons
Scottish